Conus magellanicus is a species of sea snails, marine gastropod molluscs in the family Conidae, the cone snails and their allies.

Like all species within the genus Conus, these snails are predatory and venomous. They are capable of "stinging" humans, therefore live ones should be handled carefully or not at all.

Distribution
This species occurs in the Caribbean Sea off Panama, Mexico, Guadeloupe and Martinique.

Description 
The maximum recorded shell length is 26 mm. The smooth shel lshows distant revolving striae, the upper ones nearly obsolete. The spire is concavely depressed, with a raised pink apex and is somewhat tuberculate. Its color is yellowish with a band of irregular white blotches dotted and shaded with chestnut in the center, and smaller ones at the upper part and base.

Habitat 
Minimum recorded depth is 0 m. Maximum recorded depth is 26 m.

References

  Petit, R. E. (2009). George Brettingham Sowerby, I, II & III: their conchological publications and molluscan taxa. Zootaxa. 2189: 1–218
 Puillandre N., Duda T.F., Meyer C., Olivera B.M. & Bouchet P. (2015). One, four or 100 genera? A new classification of the cone snails. Journal of Molluscan Studies. 81: 1–23

External links
 The Conus Biodiversity website
 Cone Shells - Knights of the Sea
 

magellanicus
Gastropods described in 1792